The Cry of the Eagle (Italian: Il grido dell'aquila) is a 1923 Italian drama film directed by Mario Volpe and starring Gustavo Serena and Dillo Lombardi. It was made as a film supportive of Italy's new regime under Mussolini, and drew direct links between the risorgimento, the First World War and the rise of Fascism.

Cast
 Manlio Bertoletti
 Mariano Bottino
 Alfredo Cruichi
 Adriana De Cristoforis
 Dillo Lombardi
 Giovanni Polli
 Bianca Renieri
 Gustavo Serena
 Giulio Tanfani-Moroni
 Renato Visca

References

Bibliography
 Brunetta, Gian Piero. The History of Italian Cinema: A Guide to Italian Film from Its Origins to the Twenty-first Century.  Princeton University Press, 2009.

External links

1923 films
1920s Italian-language films
Italian silent feature films
Films directed by Mario Volpe
Italian black-and-white films
1923 drama films
Italian drama films
Silent drama films
1920s Italian films